William Black may refer to:

Politicians
 William Black (Ontario politician) (1867–1944), speaker of the Legislature of Ontario and Conservative MLA
 William Black (Canadian politician) (1869–1930), Progressive party member of the Canadian House of Commons
 William Anderson Black (1847–1934), Canadian politician
 William B. Black (Illinois politician) (born 1941), member of the Illinois House of Representatives
 William George Black (1857–1932), antiquary, lawyer and politician of Glasgow
 William Pierpont Black (1877–1942), New Zealand wood carver, socialist politician, journal editor and publisher
 William Black, Lord Provost of Dundee, Scotland (1952–1954), see List of provosts of Dundee

Soldiers and sailors
 William P. Black (1842–1916), American Civil War Medal of Honor recipient
 William Black (soldier) (1853–1872), drummer boy and the youngest wounded soldier of the American Civil War
 William Murray Black (1855–1933), United States Army major general
 William Black, captain of HMS Racoon, 1811–1815

Business
 William Black (1771–1866), Canadian shipper, merchant, and office-holder
 William Black, Baron Black (1893–1984), British businessman and coachbuilder
 William Black (businessman) (c. 1902–1983), American businessman
 William Robert Black, Australia mine-owner and philanthropist
 Bill Black (businessman) (born 1950), Canadian businessman

In religion
 William Grant Black (1920–2013), American episcopal bishop of Southern Ohio
 William Henry Black (1808–1872), English antiquarian and Seventh Day Baptist leader
 William Black (Methodist) (1760–1834), Methodist minister in Nova Scotia, Canada

In arts and entertainment
 William Black (novelist) (1841–1898), Scottish novelist
 William Black (actor) (1871–?), Broadway stage and silent film actor
 William Black (pianist) (1952–2003), American classical pianist and teacher
 Bill Black (1926–1965), American bassist and bandleader
 Willem de Zwart (1862–1931),  Dutch painter, engraver and watercolorist also known as William Black

Other

 William Black (physician) (1749–1829), Irish physician and medical writer

 William B. Black Jr. (born 1936), former Deputy Director of the U.S. National Security Agency
 William K. Black (born 1951), American lawyer, academic, author, and a former bank regulator
 William Valentine Black (1832–1927), Utah pioneer
 William Black (judge) (1879–1967), barrister and judge of the Supreme Court of Ireland
 William Black (footballer) (1882–1960), Scottish footballer
 Willie Black (footballer) (1929–2015), Scottish footballer

See also
 Bill Black (disambiguation)
 , a transport ship named after William Murray Black
 William M. Black (dredge), also named after William Murray Black
 William Black Family House, Arkansas, United States, on the National Register of Historic Places
 William Black Homestead, Pennsylvania, United States, on the National Register of Historic Places
 Willie Black (disambiguation), two people and a fictional character
 Willam Black, from Kevin Smith's "View Askewniverse" films